Timothy Neal Brown (born May 29, 1956, in Bloomington, Illinois) is a Republican member of the Indiana House of Representatives, representing the 41st District since 1994. He was elected to  chair of the House Ways and Means Committee in 2012. On September 12, 2018, Brown was injured in a motorcycle accident. He retired from political life in 2022.

References

External links
Indiana State Legislature - Representative Dr. Tim Brown Official government website
Project Vote Smart - Representative Timothy Brown (IN) profile

Republican Party members of the Indiana House of Representatives
1956 births
Living people
People from Crawfordsville, Indiana
21st-century American politicians
Politicians from Bloomington, Illinois